Furia Sabinia Tranquillina (c. 225 – aft. 244 AD) was the Empress of Rome and wife of Emperor Gordian III. She was the young daughter of the Praetorian Prefect Timesitheus by an unknown wife.

In 241 AD her father was appointed the head of the Praetorian Guard by the Roman Emperor Gordian III. In May that year, Tranquillina had married Gordian. She became a Roman Empress and received the honorific title of Augusta. Her marriage to Gordian was an admission by the young emperor of both Timesitheus' political indispensability and Tranquillina's suitability as an empress.

Family tree

Sources
 Prosopographia Imperii Romani (PIR) ² F 587

References

External links
 http://www.wildwinds.com/coins/ric/tranquillina/i.html
 http://www.forumancientcoins.com/catalog/roman-and-greek-coins.asp?vpar=1034
 http://www.forumancientcoins.com/numiswiki/view.asp?key=Tranquillina
 https://www.livius.org/to-ts/tranquillina/tranquillina.html

3rd-century Roman empresses
Year of birth uncertain
220s births
244 deaths
Augustae
Furii
Gordian dynasty